En VIvo is the first live album and fourth overall album of Latin Grammy winner, singer-songwriter Kany García. The album was released on February 25, 2015. This live album was recorded at the Coliseo de Puerto Rico.

Album information
En Vivo, produced and directed by Marcos Sanchez, was recorded at García's concert in Puerto Rico that took place in February 2013. The album is composed of eighteen hits and includes an unreleased track called "Duele Menos". García had the collaboration of friends like Santiago Cruz, and Merengue artist Joseph Fonseca. The big surprise of the evening was the performance of "Estigma De Amor" who Kany sang with her mother Shela De Jesus.

Track listing

Personnel 
Antonio Alonso - Bass 
Sonlys Andino - Chorus 
Santiago Cruz - Featured Artist 
José Daniel DeJesús - Cello 
José E. Diaz - Mix 
Arnaldo Figueroa - Violin 
Joseph Fonseca - Featured Artist 
Kany García - Composer, Primary Artist, Ukulele 
Abimanuel Hernández - Chorus
Javier Matos - Viola 
Silvette Mirand - Chorus 
Yajaira O'Neill - Violin 
Julio Reyes - Composer 
Keren Rodríguez - Chorus
Marcos Sanchez - Composer, Fender Rhodes, Hammond B3, Mezcla, Piano 
Flor Ruben Torres - Backline Technician

Charts

References

External links
 

Kany García live albums
2014 live albums
Sony Music Latin live albums
Spanish-language live albums